Lars Gunnar Lie (born 18 September 1938) is a Norwegian politician from the Christian Democratic Party and was the Minister of Transport and Communications 1989–1990.

References

1938 births
Living people
Ministers of Transport and Communications of Norway
Members of the Storting
Christian Democratic Party (Norway) politicians
21st-century Norwegian politicians
20th-century Norwegian politicians